Austria's Next Topmodel, season 8 is the eight season of the Austrian reality television show in which a number of men and women compete for the title of Austria's Next Topmodel and a chance to start their career in the modelling industry. The series will be broadcast on ATV Austria.

The winner is 21 year-old Isak Omorodion from Upper Austria. As his prizes, he received a contract with Vienna-based modeling agency Wiener Models, a cover of Men's Health magazine, a one-year artist development contract of Studio71 Vienna and an Audi Q2.

Contestants

Episodes

Episode 1
Original airdate: 

This was the casting episode. The top 24 semi-finalists were narrowed down to the top 14 finalists who moved into their modelhouse.

Episode 2
Original airdate: 

Quit: Theresa Steinkellner
Eliminated:  Christian Benesch
Featured photographer: Katrin Schöning

Episode 3
Original airdate: 

Booked for a job: Allegra Bell & Edvin Franijc
Challenge winner: Simone Sevignani
Eliminated: Doina Barbaneagra & Jules Baumgartner
Featured photographers: Mato Johannik, Kosmas Pavlos

Episode 4
Original airdate: 

Booked for a job: Allegra Bell & Daniela Kuperion
Challenge winners: Allegra Bell, Edvin Franijc, Lukas Schlinger, Peter Mairhofer & Sanda Gutic
Bottom three: Edvin Franijc, Julia Forstner & Sanda Gutic
Eliminated: Edvin Franijc
Featured photographer: Richard Kranzin

Episode 5
Original airdate: 

Booked for a job: Isak Omorodion, Julia Forstner & Simone Sevignani
Challenge winners: Max Gombocz, Peter Mairhofer & Sanda Gutic
Bottom two: Daniela Kuperion & Lukas Schlinger
Eliminated: None
Featured photographer: Isabella Abel

Episode 6
Original airdate: 

Spot for the finale: Isak Omorodion
Eliminated outside judging panel: Daniela Kuperion
Challenge winner: Max Gombocz
Booked for a job: Isak Omorodion & Simone Sevignani
Bottom three: Allegra Bell, Julia Forstner & Lukas Schlinger
Eliminated: Julia Forstner & Lukas Schlinger
Featured photographer: Oliver Gast

Episode 7
Original airdate: 

Immune: Isak Omorodion
Booked for a job: Max Gombocz & Sanda Gutic
Eliminated: Max Gombocz & Sanda Gutic
Featured photographer: Oliver Gast

Episode 8
Original airdate: 

Final four: Allegra Bell, Isak Omorodion, Peter Mairhofer & Simone Sevignani
Eliminated: Allegra Bell
Final three: Isak Omorodion, Peter Mairhofer & Simone Sevignani
Austria's Next Top Model: Isak Omorodion

Results

 The contestant quit the competition
 The contestant was eliminated
 The contestant was in danger of elimination
 The contestant was immune from elimination
 The contestant was eliminated outside of judging panel
 The contestant won the competition

Photo shoot guide
Episode 1 photo shoot: Swimsuits (casting)
Episode 2 photo shoot: Posing nude in pairs
Episode 3 photo shoot: Alternative fashion in a church
Episode 4 photo shoot: Romance on the Orient Express   
Episode 5 photo shoot: Partying with their mentor
Episode 6 photo shoot:  Candyland couture with Lilly Becker
Episode 7 photo shoot:  Men's Health and Women's Health magazine covers

References

Austria's Next Topmodel
2017 Austrian television seasons
Television shows filmed in Austria
Television shows filmed in Finland
Television shows filmed in Sweden